Sexual differentiation is the process of development of the sex differences between males and females from an undifferentiated zygote. Sex determination is often distinct from sex differentiation; sex determination is the designation for the development stage towards either male or female, while sex differentiation is the pathway towards the development of the phenotype.

In many species, testicular or ovarian differentiation begins with appearance of Sertoli cells in males and granulosa cells in females. 

As male and female individuals develop from embryos into mature adults, sex differences at many levels develop, such as genes, chromosomes, gonads, hormones, anatomy, and psyche. Beginning with determination of sex by genetic and/or environmental factors, humans and other organisms proceed down different pathways of differentiation as they grow and develop. These processes are not fixed, and can change over one organism's lifetime or over many generations evolutionarily.

Sex determination systems
Humans, many mammals, insects and other animals have an XY sex-determination system. Humans have forty-six chromosomes, including two sex chromosomes, XX in females and XY in males. The Y chromosome must carry at least one essential gene which determines testicular formation (originally termed TDF). A gene in the sex-determining region of the short arm of the Y, now referred to as SRY, has been found to direct production of a protein, testis determining factor, which binds to DNA, inducing differentiation of cells derived from the genital ridges into testes. In transgenic XX mice (and some human XX males), SRY alone is sufficient to induce male differentiation.

Other chromosomal systems exist in other taxa, such as the ZW sex-determination system in birds and the XO system in insects.

Environmental sex determination refers to the determination (and then differentiation) of sex via non-genetic cues like social factors, temperature, and available nutrients. In some species, such as the hermaphroditic clownfish, sex differentiation can occur more than once as a response to different environmental cues, offering an example of how sex differentiation does not always follow a typical linear path.

There have been multiple transitions between environmental and genetic sex determination systems in reptiles over time, and recent studies have shown that temperature can sometimes override sex determination via chromosomes.

Humans

The early stages of human differentiation appear to be quite similar to the same biological processes in other mammals and the interaction of genes, hormones and body structures is fairly well understood. In the first weeks of gestation, a fetus has no anatomic  or hormonal sex, and only a karyotype distinguishes male from female. Specific genes induce gonadal differences, which produce hormonal differences, which cause anatomic differences, leading to psychological and behavioral differences, some of which are innate and some induced by the social environment.

Various processes are involved in the development of sex differences in humans. Sexual differentiation in humans includes development of different genitalia and the internal genital tracts, breasts, body hair, and plays a role in gender identification.

The development of sexual differences begins with the XY sex-determination system that is present in humans, and complex mechanisms are responsible for the development of the phenotypic differences between male and female humans from an undifferentiated zygote. Atypical sexual development, and ambiguous genitalia, can be a result of genetic and hormonal factors.

The differentiation of other parts of the body than the sex organ creates the secondary sex characteristics. Sexual dimorphism of skeletal structure develops during childhood, and becomes more pronounced at adolescence.  Sexual orientation has been demonstrated to correlate with skeletal characters that become dimorphic during early childhood (such as arm length to stature ratio) but not with characters that become dimorphic during puberty—such as shoulder width.

Other animals
The first genes involved in the cascade of differentiation can differ between taxa and even between closely related species. For example: in zebrafish the first known gene to induce male differentiation is the amh gene, in tilapia it is tDmrt1, and in southern catfish it is foxl2.

In fish, due to the fact that modes of reproduction range from gonochorism (distinct sexes) to self-fertilizing hermaphroditism (where one organism has functioning gonadal features of multiple sexes), sexual differentiation is complex. Two major pathways in gonochores exist: one with a nonfunctional intersexual phase leading to delayed differentiation (secondary), and one without (primary), where differences between the sexes can be noted prior to hatching. Secondary gonochorists remain in the intersex phase until a biotic or abiotic cue directs development down one pathway. Primary gonochorism, without an intersex phase, follows classical pathways of genetic sex determination, but can still be later influenced by the environment. Differentiation pathways progress, and secondary sex characteristics such as anal fin bifurcation and ornamentation typically arise at puberty.

In birds, thanks to research on Gallus gallus domesticus, it has been shown that determination of sex is likely cell-autonomous, i.e. that sex is determined in each somatic cell independently of, or in conjunction with, the hormone signaling that occurs in other species. Studies on gynandromorph chickens showed that the mosaicism could not be explained by hormones alone, pointing to direct genetic factors, possibly one or a few Z-specific genes such as double-sex or DMRT1.

In cattle, freemartins have intersex development.

Flexibility 
The most intensively studied species, such as fruit flies, nematodes, and mice, reveal that evolutionarily, sex determination/differentiation systems are not wholly conserved and have evolved over time. Beyond the presence or absence of chromosomes or social/environmental factors, sexual differentiation can be regulated in part by complex systems like the ratio of genes on X chromosomes and autosomes, protein production and transcription, and specific mRNA splicing.

Differentiation pathways can be altered at many stages of the process. Sex reversal, where the development of a sexual phenotype is redirected during embryonic development, happens in the initiation phase of gonadal sex differentiation. Even in species where there is a well-documented master regulator gene, its effects can be overridden by a downstream gene.

Furthermore, hermaphrodites serve as examples of the flexibility of sexual differentiation systems. Sequential hermaphrodites are organisms that possess reproductive capabilities of one sex, and then that sex changes. Differentiated gonadal tissue of the organism's former sex degenerates, and new sex gonadal tissue grows and differentiates. Organisms that have the physiological capability to reproduce as a male and as a female at the same time are known as simultaneous hermaphrodites. Some simultaneous hermaphroditic organisms, like certain species of goby, have distinctive male and female phases of reproduction and can flip back and forth, or "sex reverse", between the two.

Socially-determined 
In some species, such as sequentially hermaphroditic clownfish, changes in social environment can lead to sexual differentiation or sex reversal, i.e. differentiation in the opposite direction. In clownfish, females are larger than males, and in social groups, there is typically one large female, multiple smaller males, and undifferentiated juveniles. If the female is removed from the group, the largest male changes sex, i.e. the former gonad tissue degenerates and new gonad tissue grows. Furthermore, the pathway of differentiation in activated in the largest juvenile, which becomes male.

Alternative morphs 
Sexual differentiation in a species does not have to produce one recognizable female type and one recognizable male type. In some species alternative morphs, or morphotypes, within one sex exist, such as flanged (larger than females, with large flap-like cheek-pads) and unflanged (about the same size as females, no cheek-pads) male orangutans, and sometimes differences between male morphs can be more noticeable than differences between a male and a female within such species. Furthermore, sexual selection can be involved in the development of different types of males with alternative reproductive strategies, such as sneaker and territorial males in dung beetles or haremic males and pair-bonding males in the Nigerian cichlid fish P. pulcher. Sometimes alternative morphs are produced by genetic differences, and in other cases, the environment can be involved, demonstrating some degree of phenotypic plasticity.

Brain differentiation

In many animals, differences in the exposure of a fetal brain to sex hormones are correlated with significant differences of brain structure and function, which correlate with adult reproductive behavior. The causes of differences between the sexes are only understood in some species. Fetal sex differences in human brains coupled with early differences in experience may be responsible for sex differences observed in children between 4 years old and adolescence.

Many individual studies in humans and other primates have found statistically significant sex differences in specific brain structures; however, some studies have found no sex differences, and some meta-analyses have called into question the over-generalization that women and men's brains function differently. Males and females statistically differ in some aspects of their brains, but there are areas of the brain which appear not to be sexually differentiated at all. Some scholars describe human brain variation not as two distinct categories, but as occupying a place on a maleness-femaleness continuum.

In birds, hypotheses of male-female brain sex differences have been challenged by recent findings that differences between groups can be at least partially explained by the individual's dominance rank. Furthermore, the behavioral causes of brain sex differences have been enumerated in studies of sex differences between different mating systems. For example, males of a polygynous vole species with intrasexual male competition have better spatial learning and memory than the females of their own species, but also better spatial learning and memory than all sexes of other closely related species that are monogamous; thus the brain differences commonly seen as "sex differences" have been instead linked to competition. Sexual selection does play a role in some species, though, as males who display more song behaviors are selected for by females⁠—so some sex differences in bird song brain regions seem to have been evolutionarily selected for over time.

References

Bibliography

External links
 Human Sexual Differentiation by P. C. Sizonenko
 The Ciba Collection of Medical Illustrations: Vol.2, Reproductive System by Frank H. Netter, M.D. comparing female and male reproductive systems development and anatomy
 Development of the Female Sexual & Reproductive Organs – illustrations comparing female and male genitalia during the early development

Sex differences in humans